Charles Dawson (1864–1916) was a British amateur archaeologist.

Charles Dawson may also refer to:

 Charles Dawson (billiards player), world champion at English billiards
 Charles B. Dawson, American politician from California
 Charles Dawson (Irish politician) (1842–1917), Irish nationalist MP
 Charles Eric Dawson (1922–1993), Canadian-American ichthyologist
 Charles I. Dawson (1881–1969), United States federal judge from Kentucky
 Charles M. Dawson (1893–1973), Lieutenant Governor of Indiana
 Charles M. Dawson (born 1848), member of the Indiana House of Representatives and Indiana State Senate
 Chuck Dawson, a fictional character in Action Comics
 Charles Dawson (doctor) (died 1956), New Zealand doctor and Member of the Legislative Council in Western Samoa
 Charles C. Dawson, American painter, printmaker, and illustrator
 Charlie Dawson, English footballer

See also
 Dawson (surname)